Hinduja Cargo Services was a cargo airline based in New Delhi, India. It was a joint venture between the Hinduja Group and German airline Lufthansa Cargo. The company operated a fleet of Boeing 727 freighters, flying from airports in the Indian subcontinent to feed Lufthansa Cargo's hub in the Middle East.

History

Before 1996, Lufthansa Cargo was operating Douglas DC-8 aircraft between Germany and several Indian cities, including Delhi and Mumbai, as well as a cargo hub at Sharjah in the United Arab Emirates. To increase capacity, Hinduja Cargo Services was formed in April 1996 through a partnership with the Hinduja Group; Hinduja owned a 60% share, with Lufthansa taking the remaining 40%. Two Boeing 727-200F freighters were acquired to replace the DC-8 routes, rising to five aircraft in October 1996.

In July 1999, a company 727-243F operating Lufthansa Cargo Flight 8533 crashed into a hill after takeoff from Kathmandu, Nepal. All five crew died in the crash.

Lufthansa Cargo suspended its agreement with the Hinduja Group in April 2000, citing higher-than-expected demand which could be better met with direct flights from Frankfurt. The airline was consequently closed by Hinduja in 2001.

References

Defunct airlines of India
Airlines established in 1996
Airlines disestablished in 2001